Kathryn Wright Azaria (born December 25, 1971) is an American therapist and retired actress.

Career
Wright began her acting career in two episodes of The Wonder Years and later had leading roles in several network television films, in addition to appearing as a regular on two prime time soap operas, the short-lived Malibu Shores and the megahit Melrose Place. She has also received some film writer and director training. Wright received the Best Actress Award at the 2000 Slamdunk Film Festival for her role in Hairshirt, which she also co-produced.

Wright retired from acting in 2001 and studied to be a family therapist.

Personal life
The daughter of Scott (a physician) and Mary Wright, she was born in Kansas City, Missouri, and grew up in Villanova, Pennsylvania, graduating in 1990 from Harriton High School. Wright has been married to actor/director Hank Azaria since 2007 and gave birth to a son in 2009.

Filmography

Film

Television

References

External links 

1971 births
Living people
20th-century American actresses
21st-century American actresses
Actresses from Philadelphia
American child actresses
American film actresses
American television actresses
Actresses from Kansas City, Missouri
Harriton High School alumni